The 2018 Valparaiso Crusaders football team represented Valparaiso University in the 2018 NCAA Division I FCS football season. They were led by fifth-year head coach Dave Cecchini and played their home games at Brown Field. They competed in the Pioneer Football League. They finished the season 2–9, 2–6 in PFL play to finish in a three-way tie for seventh place.

Previous season
The Crusaders finished the 2017 season 6–5, 5–3 in PFL play to finish in a three-way tie for third place. The Crusaders had a winning season for the first time since 2003 and had five league wins for the first time since 1961.

Preseason

Preseason All-PFL team
The PFL released their preseason all-PFL team on July 30, 2018, with the Crusaders having three players selected.

Offense

Tom Schofield – OL

Defense

Nick Turner – LB

Special teams

Bailey Gessinger – RET

Preseason coaches poll
The PFL released their preseason coaches poll on July 31, 2018, with the Crusaders predicted to finish in a tie for fourth place.

Schedule

Source: Schedule

Game summaries

at Duquesne

at Youngstown State

Truman State

Davidson

at Dayton

Butler

at Morehead State

Drake

at Marist

Jacksonville

at Stetson

References

Valparaiso
Valparaiso Beacons football seasons
Valparaiso Crusaders football